Concordia Academy is a Christian high school (Grades 9–12) in Roseville, Minnesota, United States. Established in 1893, it is a Christian high school owned and operated by the Lutheran High School Association of St. Paul and affiliated with the Lutheran Church–Missouri Synod.

History 

Concordia Academy originated in 1893 as the high school portion of Concordia College (now University) in St. Paul, Minnesota. In 1967, the academy merged with St. Paul Lutheran High School, which had been founded in 1959. St. Paul Lutheran had occupied the building at 2400 North Dale Street in Roseville since 1962; that location became the site of the merged schools.

Demographics
The demographic breakdown of the 228 students enrolled in 2015-2016 was:
Asian/Pacific islanders - 15.4%
Black - 7.0%
Hispanic - 5.7%
White - 71.9%

Notable alumni
Janet Cobbs: Olympian (Volleyball)
Ben Goodrich: Paralympian (Judo)

References

External links 
 

Private high schools in Minnesota
Educational institutions established in 1893
Lutheran schools in Minnesota
Schools in Hennepin County, Minnesota
Buildings and structures in Roseville, Minnesota
1893 establishments in Minnesota
Secondary schools affiliated with the Lutheran Church–Missouri Synod